GNUstep is a free software implementation of the Cocoa (formerly OpenStep) Objective-C frameworks, widget toolkit, and application development tools for Unix-like operating systems and Microsoft Windows. It is part of the GNU Project.

GNUstep features a cross-platform, object-oriented IDE.  Apart from the default Objective-C interface, GNUstep also has bindings for Java, Ruby, GNU Guile and Scheme. The GNUstep developers track some additions to Apple's Cocoa to remain compatible. The roots of the GNUstep application interface are the same as the roots of Cocoa: NeXTSTEP and OpenStep. GNUstep thus predates Cocoa, which emerged when Apple acquired NeXT's technology and incorporated it into the development of the original Mac OS X, while GNUstep was initially an effort by GNU developers to replicate the technically ambitious NeXTSTEP's programmer-friendly features.

History 
GNUstep began when Paul Kunz and others at Stanford Linear Accelerator Center wanted to port HippoDraw from NeXTSTEP to another platform. Instead of rewriting HippoDraw from scratch and reusing only the application design, they decided to rewrite the NeXTSTEP object layer on which the application depended. This was the first version of libobjcX. It enabled them to port HippoDraw to Unix systems running the X Window System without changing a single line of their application source. After the OpenStep specification was released to the public in 1994, they decided to write a new objcX which would adhere to the new APIs. The software would become known as "GNUstep".

Software architecture

Rendering 
GNUstep contains a set of graphical control elements written in the Objective-C programming language.

The graphical user interface (GUI) of GNUMail is composed of graphics control elements. GNUMail has to interact with the windowing system, e.g. X11 or Wayland, and its graphical user interface has to be rendered. GNUstep's backend provides a small set of functions used by the user interface library to interface to the actual windowing system. It also has a rendering engine which emulates common Postscript functions. The package gnustep-back provides the following backends:

 cairo – default backend using the Cairo 2D graphics library.
 winlib – default backend on Microsoft Windows systems. Cairo and Windows API variants.
 art – old (deprecated) backend on unix-like systems. Uses the vector-based PostScriptlike 2d graphics library Libart.
 xlib – old (deprecated) X11 backend.

Paradigms 
GNUstep inherits some design principles proposed in OPENSTEP (GNUstep predates Cocoa, but Cocoa is based on OPENSTEP) as well as the Objective-C language.

 Model–view–controller paradigm
 Target–action
 Drag-and-drop
 Delegation
 Message forwarding (through NSInvocation)

Other interfaces 
In addition to the Objective-C interface, some small projects under the GNUstep umbrella implement other APIs from Apple:
 The Boron library aims to implement the Carbon API. It is very incomplete.
 The CoreBase library is designed to be compatible with Core Foundation. It is not complete enough to for the Base (Foundation Kit) component to simply be a wrapper around it.
 The QuartzCore library implements Core Animation APIs. The Opal library implements Quartz 2D.
, there are no projects that build the Swift programming language against the GNUstep Objective-C environment.

Applications 
Here are some examples of applications written for or ported to GNUstep.

Written from scratch 
 Addresses, an address/contacts manager
 Étoilé, a desktop environment
 GNUMail, an e-mail client
 GNUstep Database Library 2, an Enterprise Objects Framework clone
 GNUstepWeb, an application server compatible with WebObjects 4.x
 Gorm, an interface builder
 GWorkspace, a workspace and file manager
 Grr, an RSS feed reader
 Oolite, a clone of Elite, a space simulation game with trading components
 PRICE, imaging application
 ProjectCenter, the Project Builder or Xcode equivalent.
 TalkSoup, an IRC client
 Terminal
 Zipper, a file archiver tool

Ported from NeXTSTEP, OPENSTEP, or macOS 
 Adun
 BioCocoa
 Chess
 Cenon
 DoomEd
 EdenMath
 Eggplant
 Emacs
 Fortunate
 Gomoku
 NeXTGO
 PikoPixel
 TextEdit
 TimeMon

Forks of GNUstep 
 Universal Windows Platform, which includes a WinObjC suite consisting of various parts of GNUstep and Microsoft's own implementations of things like the Cocoa Touch API.

Class capabilities

Foundation Kit
The Foundation Kit provides basic classes such as wrapper classes and data structure classes.

Application Kit

The Application Kit provides classes oriented around graphical user interface capabilities.

See also 

 Darling (software), a compatibility layer that relies on GNUstep
 GNUstep fat bundle
 GNUstep Renaissance, framework for XML description of portable GNUstep/Mac OS X user interfaces
 Miller Columns, the method of file tree browsing the GWorkspace File Viewer uses
 Property list, often used file format to store user settings
 StepTalk, Scripting framework
 Window Maker, a window manager designed to emulate the NeXT GUI as part of the wider GNUstep project

References

External links

GNUstep.org project homepage
GNUstep Applications and Developer Tutorials
The GNUstep Application Project
A 2003 interview with GNUstep developer Nicola Pero 
FLOSS Weekly Interview with Gregory Casamento and Riccardo Mottola from GNUstep
GNUstep on Debian, FreeBSD, MacPorts
NEXTSPACE desktop environment, based on GNUstep

 
Compatibility layers
Cross-platform free software
Free software programmed in Objective-C
GNU Project software
NeXT
Software that uses Cairo (graphics)
Widget toolkits
X Window System